Marijan Vuka (born 10 January 1980) is a Croatian former footballer who played as a forward, primarily within the Croatian football leagues, with stints abroad in the Russian Premier League, and Canadian Soccer League.

Career
A product of NK Osijek youth system, Vuka had spells at a number of Croatian sides in the Croatian First Football League, including NK Vukovar '91, NK Osijek, Marsonia, HNK Cibalia, NK Međimurje. Throughout his time in the Prva Liga he featured in the 2000–01 UEFA Cup, and 2001–02 UEFA Cup for NK Osijek, and played against Brøndby IF, Rapid Vienna, and AEK Athens. In 2004, he went abroad to play in the Russian Premier League with Kuban Krasnodar. After several years in Russia he returned to Croatia to play with NK Međimurje, and later played in the Croatian Second Football League with NK Grafičar Vodovod, and NK Hrvatski Dragovoljac. He would finish his football career in Croatia in the Croatian Third Football League with NK Konavljanin, and NK Višnjevac.

In 2014, he went abroad for a second term in the Canadian Soccer League to play with Burlington SC, where he appeared in 14 matches, and recorded six goals.

References

External links
 
Marijan Vuka at the Croatian Football Federation website

1980 births
Living people
Sportspeople from Osijek
Association football forwards
Croatian footballers
Croatia youth international footballers
HNK Vukovar '91 players
NK Osijek players
NK Marsonia players
FC Kuban Krasnodar players
HNK Cibalia players
NK Grafičar Vodovod players
NK Međimurje players
NK Hrvatski Dragovoljac players
NK Konavljanin players
Halton United players
First Football League (Croatia) players
Croatian Football League players
Russian Premier League players
Second Football League (Croatia) players
Canadian Soccer League (1998–present) players
Croatian expatriate footballers
Expatriate footballers in Russia
Croatian expatriate sportspeople in Russia
Expatriate soccer players in Canada
Croatian expatriate sportspeople in Canada